is a former Japanese football player and manager.

Playing career
Sowa was born in Hiroshima on May 1, 1956. After graduating from Hosei University, he played for Yammer Diesel (later Cerezo Osaka) from 1979 to 1990. He played 191 games and scored 13 goals, He was also selected Best Eleven in 1981 and 1982.

Coaching career
After retirement, Sowa started coaching career at Cerezo Osaka in 1994. In 1996, he became a manager. In 1997, he moved to Japan Football League club Sagan Tosu and served as a manager. The club joined new league J2 League in 1999. He managed the club until 1999. In 2004, he signed with Japan Football League club YKK AP (later Kataller Toyama). In 2008, the club won the 3rd place and was promoted to J2 from 2009. However in 2010 season, the club results were bad and he was sacked in September when the club at the 18th place of 19 clubs.

Managerial statistics

References

External links

1956 births
Living people
Hosei University alumni
Association football people from Hiroshima Prefecture
Japanese footballers
Japan Soccer League players
Cerezo Osaka players
Japanese football managers
J1 League managers
J2 League managers
Cerezo Osaka managers
Sagan Tosu managers
Kataller Toyama managers
Association football midfielders